Doris Magaly Ruiz Lastres (born 1941) is a Cuban musician and composer. Her compositions have been performed at a number of international music festivals.

Life
Magaly Ruiz was born in Santa Clara, Cuba, in 1941. In 1981, she graduated with a degree in Composition from the Instituto Superior de Arte de La Habana, where she studied with Harold Gramatges, César Pérez Sentenat, José Ardévol, Félix Guerrero, Alfredo Diez Nieto, Dolores Torres and Roberto Valera.

Since then, she has worked as a Professor at the Instituto as well as at the Instituto Superior Pedagógico Enrique José Varona and the provincial school of music, Amadeo Roldán. She has worked for many years as technical advisor of the subject Harmony in the Dirección Nacional de Enseñanza Artística, and technical advisor at the Centro para la Investigación y Desarrollo de la Música Cubana.

Works
Ruiz' curriculum is published in prestigious dictionaries such as The Grove Dictionary of Music and Musicians and Diccionario Iberoamericano de la Música.  Several of her compositions are included as part of the curriculum of the leading music education institutions in Cuba, among them, the Conservatorio Amadeo Roldán, the Instituto Superior de Arte de La Habana, the Instituto Superior Pedagógico Enrique José Varona and Conservatorio Alejandro Garcia Caturla. Her compositions have been performed at many festivals such as the International Musical Festival, Festival de La Habana, Festival Boleros de Oro, International Festival of Contemporary Music, the International Festival Donne in Musica in Fiuggi, Italy and the Festival Sounds of Americas, New York City, United States.  She has received the First Award in the music contests Concurso "La Edad de Oro", Concurso de la Dirección Nacional de Enseñanza Artística, Concurso Amadeo Roldán and the Concurso de la "Unión Nacional de Escritores y Artistas de Cuba".

Catalogue Symphonic Music 

Symphonic Music
 Tres piezas para pequeña orquesta, 1977
 Estructura tritemática para orquesta sinfónica, 1977
 Concierto para oboe y orquesta, 1979
 Tres ambientes sonoros, 1981

Chamber Music
 Trío, 1976
 Sonata para chelo y piano, 1977
 Juegos  con metales, 1977
 Movimientos para cuarteto de cuerdas No. 1, 1978
 Canción para un amigo, saxofón, contralto y piano, 1978.
 Tres piezas cubanas, violín y piano, 1978
 Movimiento para cuarteto de cuerdas No. 2, 1980
 Variaciones en habanera, para oboe y piano, 1983
 Variaciones en habanera, versión para flauta y piano, 1995
 Tres piezas, trombón y piano, 1994
 Fantasía, violín y piano, 1994
 Yugo y Estrella, cuarteto de cuerdas, 1995
 Dos para tres, flauta y piano, 1995
 Tres piezas cubanas, flauta y piano, 1995
 Cuasi Danzón, trombón y piano, 1996
 Dos piezas cubanas para clarinete, 1997
 Danzón, para cello y piano, 1998
 Tema con variaciones para trombón 1998
 Danzón para saxofón tenor, 1998
 Habanera, para guitarra, 1998
 Dos piezas para clarinete, 1998

Choir    
 Altura y pelos, coro mixto, texto: César Vallejo, 1976
 Al oído de una muchacha, texto: García Lorca, coro mixto, 1976
 Canción para dos pueblos (habanera y guajira), coro mixto,1994
 A Ili, coro femenino, 1995
 A Glaimí (cinco piezas), coro infantil, 1996

Piano
 Tres preludios para piano,  1978
 Tres estudios cubanos para piano, 1980
 Estudios cubanos del 4 al 12, 1978
 Pequeñas piezas cubanas, 1988
 Piezas a cuatro manos (primera serie), 1990
 Piezas a cuatro manos (segunda serie), 1994
 Estudio en mambo No. 13, 1994
 20 Miniaturas cubanas para piano, 1995

Voice and Piano
 Pueblo entre lomas (guajira), 1966
 A Víctor Jara, (canción), 1978
 Dos canciones para niños: Abuelita, Trota que trota mi caballito, 1984
 Tríptico Homenaje: Te recuerdo en un canto, Mi mariposa, Esa cabeza blanca, mezzo-soprano y piano, 1985
 Corazón no me traiciones más, bolero, 1994
 Cómo te quiero, bolero, 1994
 Con tu piel y con tu cuerpo,  bolero, 1995
 Te ha besado, 1998

References

External links 
 https://web.archive.org/web/20100422135042/http://www.magalyruiz.org/
 http://www.americancomposers.org/cubabios.htm#RUIZ

1941 births
Living people
20th-century classical composers
Cuban composers
Women classical composers
20th-century women composers